Teresa M. Bergeson (born October 5, 1942) is a former three-term Washington State Superintendent of Public Instruction.

Biography
Dr. Bergeson graduated from Emmanuel College in 1964 with a B.A. in English. In 1969, she earned a master's degree in counseling and guidance from Western Michigan University. She earned her doctoral degree from the University of Washington.

Bergeson worked as a counselor at Lincoln High School in Tacoma, Washington, and as a teacher and guidance counselor in Massachusetts and Alaska. During this period Bergeson served as chair of the National Education Association's Women's Caucus and implemented their National Women's Leadership Training Project. In 1981 Bergeson was elected vice-president of the Washington Education Association, and in 1985 she was elected president.

In 1989, she was hired as an executive director in the Central Kitsap School District where she had a supervisory role over 9 of the 21 schools in the district. From 1993 to 1996, Bergeson was the executive director of the Washington State Commission on Student Learning, in which capacity she led the development of statewide standards for students, as well as the Washington Assessment of Student Learning.

In 1996, Bergeson launched her first successful bid for the non-partisan office of Washington State Superintendent of Public Instruction. She was re-elected in 2000 and 2004. As superintendent Bergeson led further development of statewide standards and standardized tests, particularly after the Commission on Student Learning was dissolved in 1999.

In 2008, Bergeson was defeated in her run for a fourth term as Superintendent of Public Instruction by challenger Randy Dorn.

See also
Washington Assessment of Student Learning

Notes

External links 
Bergeson, T. (n.d.) By the Numbers: Rising Student Achievement in Washington State New Horizons for Learning website.

Living people
Education reform
American educators
Western Michigan University alumni
Washington (state) Superintendents of Public Instruction
University of Washington College of Education alumni
National Education Association people
Women in Washington (state) politics
1942 births
21st-century American women